The aircraft liveries and logos of airlines are used to provide distinctive branding for corporate and commercial reasons. Often they also combine symbols of national identity while being acceptable to an international market.

National flag, symbols, or elements of them

A 
 Aeroflot: National flag, with traditional winged hammer and sickle used on fuselage.  New livery adopted in 2003.
 Air Algérie: The company logo is a swallow, which is the national bird of Algeria.
 Air Koryo: Features national colours on the livery and flag on the tail.
 AirAsia: Logotype AirAsia.com.
 Air Belgium: National flag on tail and fuselage. On the tail, the logotype, a crowned AB, accompanies the flag.
 Air Canada: Blue aircraft, with the name Air Canada and a maple leaf on the front area of the fuselage, directly behind the cockpit, plus a maple leaf on the tail. In 2017, a new livery consisting of a white fuselage with a black underside, lettering and tail with red maple leaf logos on the engines, fuselage and tail was introduced. The new livery featured a black surrounding of the cockpit windows.
 Air France: National flag, formed as several sliced parallel lines of varying widths.
 Air India: The logo represents a red flying swan with the wheel of the Konark sun temple painted in orange on the swan's spread-out wing.
 Air Malta: Maltese cross.

Air Namibia:  Namibian flag.
Air Puerto Rico: The Puerto Rican flag inside a sun.
 Air Serbia: stylized double-headed eagle inspired by the Serbian coat-of-arms.
 Alitalia: national color flag in the "A" logo on the tail and in all plane.
 All Nippon Airways: The logotype "ANA".
 American Airlines: Stylized national flag on the tail, with the upgraded eagle design near the front exit doors. New livery adopted in February 2013.
 Austrian Airlines: Red-white-red tailfin with chevron (symbolizing an airplane taking off) with drop shadow added.
 Azul Linhas Aéreas Brasileiras: White aircraft with navy blue belly and tail. Several green and yellow stripes (resembling the colours of the Brazilian flag) are painted on the fuselage, tail, winglets and engines. The logo on the tail is shaped like the map of Brazil, with each of the Brazilian states being shown as different colored geometrical forms.

B 
 British Airways: Britain's flag carrier shows a section of the British Union Flag on the aircraft tail.  Some aircraft feature the Union Jack under the nose.
 Bulgaria Air: Bulgarian flag used on the tail.
 Biman Bangladesh Airlines: Balaka (In Bengali for white stork). A stork flying across the red sun.

C 
 Cathay Dragon:  Brush-stroke logo dubbed the "brush wing" represents a bird in flight through white Chinese calligraphy stroke on a red background, with a dragon from the Dragonair logo between the front door and the window cockpit.
 Cathay Pacific:  The brush-stroke logo dubbed the "brush wing" represents a bird in flight through white Chinese calligraphy stroke on a green background.
 China Airlines:  The pink plum blossom is the national flower of the Republic of China (Taiwan).
 Croatia Airlines: Part of the airline's logo consisting of a checkered design originating from the coat of arms of Croatia.

E 
 EgyptAir: The airline's logo is Horus, the sky deity in ancient Egyptian mythology, usually depicted as a falcon or a man with the head of a falcon. The airline has taken Horus as its logo because of the ancient symbolism as a "winged god of the sun".
 El Al: Blue Star of David between rising blue bands.
 Ethiopian Airlines:  Three interlocking slanted wedges as the tricolours of the flag of Ethiopia.
 Emirates: United Arab Emirates flag.
 Etihad Airways: New "Facet of Abu Dhabi" livery, color usage reminiscent of the desert landscape and geometric patterns are used.
 Evelop Airlines: Dark blue exclamation mark on a white circle.

F 
 Finnair: Stylized letter "F" in tail.

I 
Iberia: An aircraft tailfin shape from a yellow piece and red piece (the Spanish flag colors) and a Royal yellow crown next to the registration number. Formerly a stylized IB in yellow and red with a crown.
ITA Airways:the tailfin has a vertical green, white, and red stripe, derived from the Italian flag colors; the fuselage is in Savoy blue, the color of the former Italian royal family.

K 
 Kenya Airways: In 2005, Kenya Airways changed its livery. The four stripes running all through the length of the fuselage were replaced by the company slogan "Pride of Africa", whereas the KA tail logo was replaced by a styled K encircled with a Q to evoke the airline's IATA airline code.
 KLM: Stylized crown representing royal charter status.
 Korean Air: Taeguk, the national symbol of South Korea.

L 
 LAN Airlines: Five-point star over a blue background representing the one which is the national flag of Chile, also representing the two colors of it second flag carrier, Peru, and its flag colors, white and a red line below it.
 Luxair: The National Flag and the logo of the airline is on display on the back of the plane.

M 
 Malev Hungarian Airlines: National flag shaped as a tail wing made of 3 lines with the national colors (red white green).
Middle East Airlines: A cedar, which is the national emblem of Lebanon, over the white tail and with two red bands rolling from the aircraft nose to tail.

N 
 Nepal Airlines: National flag shaped as a tail wing made of sun and moon with the national colors (red blue).

P 
 Pakistan International Airlines: the national flag in a wavy design takes up the whole tail in Pakistan dark green colours with a white crescent moon and star as found on the Pakistan flag.
 Pan Am World Airways Dominicana:  National flag, painted with brush.
 Philippine Air Lines: white livery with the company logo, a heavily stylized version of the Filipino flag (blue triangle with eight-ray sun and red triangle of the same size superimposed on it), on the tail, and "Philippines" on the fuselage near the main cabin.

R 
 Royal Air Maroc: Green Sharifian star in the tail, with two parallel lines in national colors (green and red).
 Royal Brunei Airlines: Yellow tail with logotype "RB" and the Brunei national emblem at above.
 Royal Jordanian: Royal Hashemite Crown of the Jordanian Monarchy.

S 
 Saudia: Two crossed swords with a palm tree, the Emblem of Saudi Arabia.
 South African Airways: National flag colours plus sun, adopted in 1997 (replacing the springbok antelope).
 Swissair: Swiss white cross in a red parallelogram, similar logo used by successor airline Swiss International Air Lines.

T 
 TAP Air Portugal: colors of the national flag in the "TAP" logo on the tail and fuselage.

U 
 United Airlines: Upon its 2012 merger with Continental Airlines, a globe, indicative of the wide-ranging destinations available.
 US Airways: Flag, resembling the flag of the United States, is incorporated into the US Airways logo and painted on the tail.
 Uzbekistan Airways: The national flag of Uzbekistan. Incorporated into the Uzbekistan airways logo painted on the tail.

Animals

Birds

A
 Aegean Airlines: Two seagulls and a sun.
 Aerolíneas Argentinas: Condor.
 Avianca: Condor.
 Aeromexico: Eagle Knight.
 Air Algérie: Swallow, which is the national bird of Algeria.
 Air Arabia: Seagull.
 Air Koryo: Crane along with the national flag of the DPRK
 Air Lithuania: A crane.
 Air Mauritius: Red paille-en-queue (phaeton rubicola), a fish-eating tropical bird.
 Air Macau: Dove, with the wing also forming the shape of a lotus.

 Air Niugini: Raggiana bird of paradise (Paradisaea raggiana)
 Air Seychelles: Pair of white fairy terns (Sterna nereis).
 American Airlines: Eagle.
 Air Zimbabwe: Zimbabwe Bird.
 Aurigny: Atlantic Puffin (Fratercula arctica).

B
 Bali Air: Purple bird.
 Biman Bangladesh Airlines: Silhouette of a flying white stork balaka on the sun.

C
 Canadian Airlines: Canada goose.
 Caribbean Airlines: Hummingbird.
 Cebu Pacific: Philippine eagle.
 Centralwings: Skua. 
 China Eastern Airlines: Swallow. 
 China Yunnan Airlines: Peacock.
 Condor Flugdienst: Condor.

F
 Fly Jamaica Airways: Black-green-yellow-billed streamertail (Trochilus polytmus).
 Frontier Airlines: Various animals.

G
 Gulf Air: Falcon.
 Garuda Indonesia: Eagle.

I
 Iraqi Airways: Swallow.

J
 Japan Airlines: Crane logo, called tsurumaru. A national flag, an arc of the hinomaru had been used from 2008 till 2011.

K
 Kingfisher Airlines: Kingfisher bird.

L
 LOT Polish Airlines: Crane, designed by Tadeusz Gronowski in 1929.

 Lufthansa and Deutsche Luft Hansa: Crane, designed by Otto Firle in 1919.

M
 Mandarin Airlines: Gyrfalcon.
 Mexicana de Aviación: Eagle.
 Montenegro Airlines: Eagle.

N
 Nok Air: Open beak.
 North Central Airlines: Duck.

S
 SATA Air Azores: Goshawk
 Singapore Airlines: SilverKris
 SilkAir: Seagull.
 SriLankan Airlines: Peacock
 Syrian Air :  Condor.

T
 TACA Airlines: Macaw.
 TAM Airlines: Blue seagull crossing the airline's name.
 TAROM: Swallow, first introduced in 1954.
 Turkish Airlines: Wild goose-greylag goose.
 Turkmenistan Airlines: Egret.

X
 Xiamen Airlines: Crane.

Other airlines which use non-specific birds include Kuwait Airways, Ariana Afghan Airlines, Biman Bangladesh and Ukraine International Airlines.

Other animals

A
 Air Tanzania: Giraffe.

B
 Belle Air: Butterfly.

C
 Cyprus Airways: Mouflon.
 Cayman Airways: Turtle.

E
 East African Airways: Lion.

L
 Lion Air: Winged lion.

M
 Malindo Air: Winged lion.

 MIAT Mongolian Airlines: Horse.

N
 Nigeria Airways: Elephant.

Q
 Qantas: Kangaroo, introduced in 1944 (had wings from 1947 to 1984).
 Qatar Airways: Oryx.

S
 South African Airways:  Springbok (discontinued).

T
 TAAG Angola Airlines: Sable antelope.
 Tiger Airways: Tiger.
 Tunisair: Gazelle.

Plants

A 
 Aer Lingus: Irish shamrock, first introduced in 1965.
 Air Canada: Maple leaf, the symbol of Canada.
 Air New Zealand: Fern frond unfolding, a Māori symbol for new life known as a koru.
 Air Tahiti Nui: Tiare.
 Airnorth: Palm tree.
 Aloha Airlines: Bird-of-Paradise flower.

C 
 China Airlines: Plum blossom flower (prunus mume), introduced in 1995.
 China Southern Airlines: Bombax ceiba flower.

E 
 Edelweiss: Edelweiss flower.

L 
 Lao Airlines: Champa (frangipani) flower.

M 
 Middle East Airlines: Lebanon cedar.

P 
 Pan Pacific Airlines: Striped leaf, with type "panpacific".

T 
 Thai Airways International: Calotropis gigantea, also known as crown flower, and not an orchid as usually assumed.

V 
Vietnam Airlines: Yellow Lotus.

People

 Adam Air: Human with Wings.
 Aeroméxico: Aztec eagle-warrior.
 Asian Spirit: Colorful mask.
 Alaska Airlines: Inupiat, possibly Oliver Amouak. 
 Hawaiian Airlines: Hawaiian Native woman, also known as "Pualani" (Hawaiian for Flower in the Sky).
 Norwegian Air Shuttle: Each tail fin features a Nordic entrepreneur, artist, painter, actor or explorer.
 Siam Air: Woman.

Objects

A 
 Air Transat: Blue star.
 America Trans Air: Airfield or airport runway approach.

C 
 Czech Airlines: Red diamond.

D 
 Delta Air Lines: Red widget, rotated to represent a takeoff (updated 2007). On the reverse side, it points northwest due to the merger with Northwest Airlines.

E 
 EVA Air: Dark green background with a global logo in orange and green (modified version of the Evergreen Group logo).

I 
 Icelandair: Yellow and orange wings on blue (representing midnight sun, volcanoes and the dark seas around Iceland).

K 
 KLM:  Crown.

M 
 Malaysia Airlines:  Red and blue wau bulan (moon kite), restylised in 1987.
 Mandala Airlines: Eight-pointed mandala with a five-petaled lotus in its center.
 Merpati Nusantara Airlines: Feathers or wings.

N 
 Northwest Airlines: Compass rose pointing northwest (on the port side - the compass points northeast on the starboard side). This up-and-forward-pointing design influenced Delta Air Lines' current livery.

O 
 Olympic Air/Olympic Airlines:  Six interlocking rings (originally five; a sixth was added to differentiate itself from the protected Olympic flag).

P 
 Philippine Airlines: Sail, the two triangles of blue and red with a sun and the red triangle superimposed on the blue triangle.

R 
 Ryanair: Morph between a flying angel and a harp.

S 
 SkyJet Airlines: Blue background with sky and clouds within a star.

T 
 All TUI Group airlines: Red smile design.

U 
 United Airlines 1974–2010 logo: Blue and red colored stripes forming an overlapping "U" for "United". Nicknamed the Tulip. The new United Airlines logo, after the Continental merger, uses the globe from Continental Airlines.

V 
 Varig:  Compass rose.

Colours

A 
 Asiana Airlines: Cross-diagonal shades, combining gray, red, yellow and blue.

E 
 EasyJet: White and bright orange.

G 
 GMG Airlines: Butterfly wings in 64 colours.
 Garuda Indonesia: Cross-diagonal shades of blue and green.

I 
 IndiGo: Blue and indigo color stripes.

J 
 JetBlue: White and shades of blue, depending on the tail logo.

K 
 KLM: Bright blue all over the upper half of the aircraft, with a dark blue line separating it from the white lower half.
 Korean Air: Light blue all over the upper half of the aircraft, with a thick silver line separating it from the white lower half.

S 
 Southwest Airlines: Yellow, red and royal blue livery.
Spirit Airlines: Bright yellow, "sketch-like" black letters on body and tail, "Home of the Bare Fare®" on engines.
Swoop: Magenta stripe from name to tail.

Legendary figures

A 
 Aeroméxico: Quetzalcoatl, as a special livery for a Boeing 787-9 Registered XA-ADL, Baptized under the name of Quetzalcoatl.
 Air China: Phoenix, in the form of the letters "VIP".

D 
 Dragonair: Dragon (with three claws on its left side, one on its right).
 Druk Air: Dragon.

E 
 Egyptair: Falcon-headed Horus, the winged Egyptian god of the sun, restylised in 2008.

G 
 Garuda Indonesia : Garuda holybird from the mythical Hinduism and redefined as the national emblem of Indonesia.

I 
 Iran Air: Griffin.

S 
 Spirit of Manila Airlines: Sarimanok is a legendary bird of the Philippines.
 Srilankan Airlines: 'Monara' from the mythical Dandumonara Yanthra (a flying machine that resembles a peacock).

V 
 Varig: Varig's first logo was an image of Icaro and its wings. After the adoption of the "star" (in fact it was a stylished compass) the Icaro figure was maintained on the fuselage of the airplanes, near the front door.

Unpopular designs

 British Airways introduced unusual tailfin designs in 1997. These "airline liveries and logos" were intended to make the airline's branding more cosmopolitan and were described as "arty" and "ethnic". They were unpopular with many customers and also caused confusion for ground controllers who had more difficulty recognising the British Airways ethnic liveries aircraft to give clear taxiing instructions. Despite the £60 million expense of this livery, it was replaced completely in 2001 and the airline has now returned to a more traditional design based upon the Union flag.
 Brussels Airlines' first logo was a stylised letter B composed of 13 dots resembling a runway.  This was thought to be unlucky, and protests by superstitious passengers caused the airline to add another dot.

References

External links
 AirlineLogos.net - Over 7550 airline Logos - an airline logo website
 Branding on airsickness bags
 The tales on the tails at Answerstravel

Liveries and logos
Brand management
Communication design
Commercial logos
Aircraft markings
Airline liveries and logos
Aircraft liveries